Castilleja affinis is a species of Castilleja known by the common name coast Indian paintbrush.

It is native to western North America from Washington to Baja California, where it grows on hills and mountains slopes along the coast and inland.

Description
This is a perennial herb growing an erect stem up to about 60 centimeters in maximum height. It is greenish to purple in color and may be hairless to quite hairy. The leaves are variable in shape and up to 8 centimeters long. The inflorescence is a series of bracts in shades of bright red to yellowish. Flowers appearing between the bracts are a bit longer and covered in hairs. They are green to purple lined with red or yellow. The fruit is a capsule just over a centimeter long.

Subspecies
There are three subspecies of this plant, two of which are rare: 
Subspecies littoralis grows on the coastline of northern California and Oregon. 
Subspecies neglecta, known commonly as the Tiburon paintbrush, is known from only a few occurrences in and around the San Francisco Bay Area. It is a federally listed endangered species.
Subspecies affinis is the most widespread subspecies.

External links

Jepson Manual Treatment: Castilleja affinis
Castilleja affinis — U.C. Photo gallery

affinis
Flora of Baja California
Flora of California
Flora of Oregon
Flora of Washington (state)
Flora of the Sierra Nevada (United States)
Natural history of the California chaparral and woodlands
Natural history of the California Coast Ranges
Natural history of the Channel Islands of California
Natural history of the Peninsular Ranges
Natural history of the San Francisco Bay Area
Natural history of the Transverse Ranges
Taxa named by William Jackson Hooker
Flora without expected TNC conservation status